Dennis Osric Johnson (6 May 1939 – 22 April 2021) was a Jamaican sprinter who equalled the world record, 9.3 seconds, for the 100-yard dash in 1961. Johnson later became a coach and advisor, and the architect of the Jamaican athletics programme.

Track career 
Born in Jamaica in 1939, Johnson traveled to the United States for his college education. He studied at San Jose State College (now San Jose State University), where he was coached by the legendary sprints coach Bud Winter and was a member of the San Jose State Spartans track team.

In 1959, he won a bronze medal at the 1959 Pan American Games in the 4 × 100 m relay as a member of a combined West Indies Federation team.

In 1961, within a six-week period, he equalled the then world record for the 100 yards three times at 9.3 s:
11 March at San Jose in the San Jose State Relays meet;
15 April at San Jose in the Armed Forces Meeting;
5 May at Sunnyvale in the San Jose State All-comers meet.

(He also equalled the same time on 1 April at Stanford in a university meet but the lack of a wind gauge meant the time could not be ratified as a world record.)

His season was shortened by injury, and he could not compete for the United States collegiate and national championship titles.

In 1962, he was one of the favourites for the 100 and 220 yards titles at the 1962 British Empire and Commonwealth Games but he ended up finishing fifth in the 110 yards and withdrew from the 220 yards event because of a groin injury.

In 1964, at the Tokyo Olympics he finished 4th in the 4 × 100 m relay as a member of the Jamaican team.

Coaching career 
After leaving college, Johnson went into a career in sports development and was to become renowned as the architect of Jamaica's subsequent track and field success.

Johnson's dream on leaving San Jose State University was to take what he'd learnt there and develop, for the first time, a US-style college athletic program in Jamaica. Johnson's inspiration was the legendary San Jose sprints coach, Bud Winter - "'Bud' Winter was a master coach. I decided to come back home and bring his methodology to training sprinters in Jamaica", Johnson has stated.

In 1971, Johnson started a sports program at what was then a two-year vocational college, the College of Arts, Science and Technology (CAST), that later, in 1995, became University of Technology, Jamaica (UTech), a four-year college. Amongst Johnson's first training group was a then 20-year-old Anthony Davis, who was later to follow Johnson as sports director at UTech.

Johnson has also stated how he was also inspired to emulate the great Jamaican sprinter, Herb McKenley, who had coached Johnson in high school and passed on what he had learned from his time in the United States - "I just wanted to be like him." 
To help foster the coaching of adult athletes, Johnson and UTech entered a partnership with Stephen Francis and the MVP Track and Field club in Kingston.

Johnson has served at Utech in many capacities: as Chairman of the Sport Advisory Council; as Adjunct Associate Professor of Sport Science; the first Director of Sports; and has headed Special Projects for Intercollegiate Sports. In addition, he was the founder of the Jamaican Inter-Collegiate sports competition.

Commonly known by the initials DJ, Johnson or DJ is world-renowned as a coach and many of his pupils have gone onto coach other coaches themselves.

In 2010, he was able to start a Sports Science degree programme at UTech.

Johnson died on 22 April 2021, from COVID-19. He was 81.

Awards  
In 2001, Johnson was inducted into the San Jose State Spartans Hall of Fame.
In 2001, Johnson was awarded the Order of Distinction (OD) by the government of Jamaica.
In 2009, Johnson was awarded UTech's Chancellor's Medal.
In 2012, UTech renamed its athletes’ residence, previously known as the Track House, in Johnson's honour.
In 2014, Johnson won the Pioneer Award from Team Jamaica Buble (Team Jamaica Bickle is a support programme for Jamaican athletes and staff competing at the Penn Relays) for his "contribution to Jamaica’s progression in Track and Field and his invaluable support in the development of the sport off the track". In addition, Johnson was honoured by three branches of the United States government, receiving.
United States House of Representatives Proclamation from the office of US Congresswoman Yvette D Clarke;
a New York State Assembly Citation from the office of Assemblyman N Nick Perry;
and a New York City Council Citation from the office of Council Member Jumaane D Williams.

Rankings 
Johnson was ranked 2nd in the world in the 100 m sprint in 1961 according to the votes of the experts of Track and Field News.

References

See also 
 Dennis Johnson, sportsreference.com.
 Interview with Jamaica's Dennis Johnson, Jimson Lee, speedendurance.com, 5 December 2011.

1939 births
2021 deaths
Sportspeople from Kingston, Jamaica
Track and field athletes from San Jose, California
Jamaican male sprinters
Athletes (track and field) at the 1960 Summer Olympics
Athletes (track and field) at the 1964 Summer Olympics
Olympic athletes of the British West Indies
Olympic athletes of Jamaica
Jamaican athletics coaches
Pan American Games bronze medalists for the British West Indies
Pan American Games medalists in athletics (track and field)
Athletes (track and field) at the 1959 Pan American Games
Commonwealth Games competitors for Jamaica
Athletes (track and field) at the 1962 British Empire and Commonwealth Games
Recipients of the Order of Distinction
Medalists at the 1959 Pan American Games
Central American and Caribbean Games medalists in athletics
Deaths from the COVID-19 pandemic in Jamaica
San Jose State Spartans men's track and field athletes
Bakersfield College alumni